Coco Guzmán, known also as Coco Riot (born 1979) is a queer visual artist from Murcia, Spain, who is internationally known for their activism and artistic exploration of gender equality and feminist issues.

Guzmán was born in a small city in Southern Spain and grew up in a family of scientists. At 19, Guzman moved to France for higher education and became involved in feminist, queer, and anarchist movements in Europe. After obtaining a Master of Arts in Comparative Medieval Literature at Paris VIII University in 2003, Guzman began exploring the queer graphic novel as an artistic medium. Guzmán was accepted to the Toulouse Fine Arts Academy, to pursue a Bachelor of Fine Arts. In 2008, Guzman moved to Montreal (Canada), where they worked at articule. Guzman later moved to Toronto and taught at Seneca College and Lakehead University. Guzman currently lives in Madrid, Spain.

Exhibitions
Genderpoo (2008)
Los Fantasmas/The Ghosts (2015)
The Demonstration (2016)
Paraiso/Paradise premiere: Manif d'Art 8, International Quebec City Biennial, Quebec City, Quebec, Canada [curated group exhibition] (2017)

 Publications 
 Telling Our Stories: Immigrant Women's Resilience (2017)
 Llueven Queers''
 Artistic citizenship:Queer and Trans People of Color Community Arts Collective: Ste- Émilie Skillshare, A New Letter Named Square

References 

1979 births
Living people
21st-century Spanish artists
Queer artists
People from Murcia
Paris 8 University Vincennes-Saint-Denis alumni
Academic staff of Lakehead University
Artists from Madrid
21st-century LGBT people
Academic staff of Seneca College